Guus Janssen (born 13 May 1951) is a Dutch composer of contemporary music and a recording artist. A pianist and harpsichordist, he is also active as a jazz performer.

He studied piano and composition at the Sweelinck Academy of Music in Amsterdam with Ton de Leeuw and piano with Jaap Spaanderman. He also studied piano with Ton Hartsuiker. He has performed with John Zorn, George Lewis, Han Bennink (and Bennink's group Clusone Trio as a guest), Theo Loevendie, and Gidon Kremer. He teaches at the Royal Conservatory of The Hague.

He won the Matthijs Vermeulen Award in 1984.

He composed two operas in collaboration with Friso Haverkamp and has released several CDs.

Discography
 Klankast (Geestgronden, rec. 1987–1991)
 Lighter (Geestgronden, rec. 1992–1995) with Ernst Glerum, Wim Janssen
 Chamber & Solo (Geestgronden/Donemus rec. 1982–1996, ed. 1997)
 Zwik (Geestgronden, 1996–1997)
 Hollywood o.K. Pieces (Geestgronden, 2001)
 Guus Janssen, David Kweksilber (Geestgronden, 2006)
 Out of Frame (Geestgronden, 2008)
 Meeting Points (Bimhuis, 2015, with Oene van Geel, Lee Konitz, Michael Moore (jazz musician), Ernst Reijseger, Ernst Glerum, Wim Janssen, Han Bennink a.o.)

Festival performances 
 Open Music '92 (Открытая Музыка-92) in Saint-Petersburg, Russia

References

Filanovskij, Boris. 2003a. "Gjus Jansen/Guus Janssen". In Pro gollandskuju muzyku [On Dutch music], edited by Irina Leskovskaja, 318–29. St Petersburg: Institut Pro Arte.
Filanovskij, Boris. 2003b. "Gjus Jansen: 'Menja zanimaet nesinhronnost' žizni'" [Guus Janssen: 'I Am Interested in an Asynchrony of Life']. In Pro gollandskuju muzyku [On Dutch music], edited by Irina Leskovskaja, 330–34. St Petersburg: Institut Pro Arte.
Janssen, Guus. 2004. "Take Ten: Guus Janssen: 'Muziek is een prachtige manier om zonder woorden te gebruiken toch een eigen mentaliteit of levenshouding te laten spreken'". Draai om je oren: Jazz en meer website. (Accessed 16 February 2010)
Oskamp, Jacqueline. 2003. Radicaal gewoon: Bestaat er zoiets als Nederlandse muziek?. Amsterdam: Mets & Schilt. ,
Schönberger, Elmar. 1986. "String Quartet or 'String Quartet'". Key Notes, no. 23:13.
Waa, Frits van der. 1994. "Guus Janssen and the Skating-on-Thin-Ice Feeling". Key Notes, no. 28, no. 3 (September):8–13.
Waa, Frits van der. 2001. "Janssen, Guus". The New Grove Dictionary of Music and Musicians, second edition, edited by Stanley Sadie and John Tyrrell. London: Macmillan Publishers.

External links

Official site

1951 births
Living people
People from Heiloo
Dutch composers
Dutch pianists
Dutch jazz pianists
Dutch harpsichordists
21st-century pianists